Mieszki-Kuligi  is a village in the administrative district of Gmina Winnica, within Pułtusk County, Masovian Voivodeship, in east-central Poland.

The village has a population of 192.

References

Mieszki-Kuligi